The Lo Nuestro Award for New Artist of the Year is an honor presented annually by American network Univision. The Lo Nuestro Awards have been held since 1989 to recognize the most talented performers of Latin music. The nominees and winners were originally selected by a voting poll conducted among program directors of Spanish-language radio stations in the United States and also based on chart performance on Billboard Latin music charts, with the results tabulated and certified by the accounting firm Arthur Andersen. Starting from 2004, the winners are selected by the audience through an online survey. The trophy is shaped in the form of a treble clef.

The award was first presented in every field awarded on the Lo Nuestro Awards: Pop, Tropical, Regional Mexican and, for one time only, Rock/Alternative; however in 2013 the former categories for new artist were merged in a single one for Best New Artist in the General Field. Mexican band 3Ball MTY won the Lo Nuestro after earning the same recognition at the Latin Grammys; their record Inténtalo was the third-best selling Latin album of 2012 in the United States and received the Lo Nuestro for Regional Mexican Album. The following year two awards were created in the Pop and Tropical fields, with Mexican singer América Sierra winning for Pop New Artist, and Alex Matos earning the Tropical New Artist. In 2015, the nominees were included in only one category and featured solo artists, Aneeka and Johhny Sky, and ensembles, Kent y Tony and Proyecto X. Proyecto X received the award. In 2017, no nominees were announced for New Artist of the Year.

Winners and nominees
Listed below are the winners of the award for each year, as well as the other nominees for the majority of the years awarded.

See also
 Grammy Award for Best New Artist
 Latin Grammy Award for Best New Artist

References

New Artist of the Year
Music awards for breakthrough artist
Awards established in 2013